Nabila Syakieb (born November 18, 1985) is an Indonesian actress. She started her career as a model when she became the finalist of the Indonesian teen beauty pageant Gadis Sampul in 1999. Her breakthrough role came as the lead actress in romantic drama series Cinta SMU (2001). She won an award at the 2016 Festival Film Bandung for best actress for her role in Surga Yang Kedua.

Career
Syakieb made her acting debut when she was 16 years old in a romantic drama series Cinta SMU (2001). In 2005, she starred in Anakku Bukan Anakku with Roger Danuarta and in Aku Bukan Untukmu (2005) as Ella opposite Bertrand Antolin. She performed in the drama series Anugerah (2011) produced by SinemArt. After performing in many television drama series and commercials, she took a break from acting and focused on equestrianism. Later in 2013, she won a medal for the dressage category in an Indonesian national equestrian championships AE Kawilarang Memorial Cup  In 2015, she served as the lead role in Cinta di Langit Taj Mahal (2015) produced by Maxima Pictures opposite Shaheer Sheikh and Evan Sanders.

Personal life
Syakieb married equestrian athlete Reshwara Argya Ardinal on December 20, 2015 in Jakarta. She gave birth to Raqeema Ruby Radinal in 2018. Her son Rasheed Ravindra Radinal was born on 2019.

Television
Cinta SMU (2001) as Putri Regina Prayoga
Pilihlah Aku (2004) as Nayla
Anakku Bukan Anakku (2005) as Tatia
Aku Bukan Untukmu (2005) as Ella
Taqwa (2006) as Desi
Maha Kasih (2006) Eps : Cinta Dalam Sepiring Kangkung
Darling (2007) as Darling
Jodoh Romantis (2007) as Nayla
Maha Cinta (2007)
Ratu (2007) as Ratu
Kasih (2007) as Kasih
Sinema Romantis (2008) episode Pembantu Super Tajir
Yasmin (2008) as Yasmin
Cinta dan Anugerah (2009) as Nabila Fatharani
Mertua dan Menantu (2010) as Aisyah
Anugerah (2011) as Nabila Dharmawan
ISkul Musikal (2012) as herself (cameo)
Detak Cinta (2014) as Saskia
Cinta di Langit Taj Mahal (2015) as Najwa
Surga Yang Ke 2 (2016) as Sabrina

Music video appearances
Sinar - Piknik
Uiuaa - Kiki
Sebuah Rahasia - KLa Project
Kupersembahkan - Nirwana Element
Hip-hip Hura - Ruben Onsu

References

External links
 
 

1985 births
Indonesian female models
Indonesian actresses
Living people
Indonesian female equestrians
Indonesian Muslims
Indonesian people of Arab descent